Haematodendron is a monotypic genus of trees in the family Myristicaceae containing a single species, Haematodendron glabrum, endemic to forests of east Madagascar.

References

Trees of Madagascar
Myristicaceae
Myristicaceae genera
Monotypic magnoliid genera
Taxa named by René Paul Raymond Capuron